Império dos Sentidos (Portuguese for "Realm of the Senses") is the second studio album by the Brazilian musician Fausto Fawcett. Like Fausto Fawcett e os Robôs Efêmeros, it was released by WEA (present-day Warner Music Group) in April 1989 and produced by Os Paralamas do Sucesso frontman Herbert Vianna, who also co-authored some tracks and played the electric guitar and keyboards. The album's title is a nod to Nagisa Ōshima's 1976 film In the Realm of the Senses; the title track uses samples from the film.

A concept album described as a "porno-futuristic opera", it closely follows its predecessor in terms of sonority and continuity; however, its events are not limited to the city of Rio de Janeiro – "Santa Clara Poltergeist" and "Androide Nisei" (a "sequel of sorts" to "Gueixa Vadia") are set in São Paulo, while "Facada Leite Moça" is set in Canada. One year after the album's release, Fawcett published a novel based around the Santa Clara Poltergeist character through Editora Eco. In 1992 he wrote a short story adaptation of "Facada Leite Moça", including it on his book Básico Instinto (not to be mistaken with the album of the same name).

"Cicciolina (O Cio Eterno)" is a tribute to the eponymous porn star. Actress and former model Sílvia Pfeifer also has a track named after her, and is featured in both the album's front and back cover; she was chosen by Fawcett because, in his words, she "epically embodies a certain sense of 'worldliness', and has an inhuman beauty that makes me want to create".

Império dos Sentidos would be Fawcett's last album to feature his backing band Os Robôs Efêmeros; for its 1993 follow-up Básico Instinto he formed another project, the "Falange Moulin Rouge" ("Moulin Rouge Phalanx"), to accompany him in his performances.

Track listing

Personnel
 Fausto Fawcett – vocals
 Carlos Laufer – electric guitar, additional vocals
 Pedro Leão – electric guitar, additional vocals
 Marcelo Lobato – drums, additional vocals
 Marcos Lobato – bass guitar, additional vocals
 Herbert Vianna – electric guitar, keyboards, production
 Flávio Colker – photography
 Luiz Stein – cover art

References

1989 albums
Concept albums
Fausto Fawcett albums
Warner Music Group albums